Bonello is a surname. Notable people with the surname include:

Agostino Bonello (born 1949), Maltese production designer, art director and film producer
Bertrand Bonello (born 1968), French film director, screenwriter, producer and composer
Giovanni Bonello (born 1936), Maltese judge
Henry Bonello (born 1988), Maltese footballer
Joe Bonello (born 1961), Maltese Roman Catholic bishop
John Bonello (born 1958), Maltese footballer
Justin Bonello (born 1971), South African chef, television personality and producer
Mario Bonello (born 1974), Maltese sprinter
Mathieu Bonello (born 1982), French rugby union player
Michael C. Bonello, Maltese banker
Michelle Bonello (born 1985), Canadian women's ice hockey player
 

Maltese-language surnames